Robert Edward Stevenson (31 March 1905 – 30 April 1986) was an English film screenwriter, director and actor.

After directing a number of British films, including King Solomon's Mines (1937), he was contracted by David O. Selznick and moved to Hollywood, but was loaned to other studios, directing Jane Eyre (1943). He directed 19 films for The Walt Disney Company in the 1950s, 1960s and 1970s. Stevenson is best remembered for directing the Julie Andrews musical Mary Poppins (1964), for which Andrews won the Academy Award for Best Actress and Stevenson was nominated for Best Director. His other Disney films include the first two Herbie films, The Love Bug (1968) and Herbie Rides Again (1974), as well as Bedknobs and Broomsticks (1971). Three of his films featured English actor David Tomlinson.

Education
Having attended Shrewsbury School, Stevenson won a scholarship to study at St John's College, Cambridge. There he won the John Bernard Seely Prize for Aeronautics, and in 1927 graduated with a first-class MA (Cantab) degree in the Mechanical Sciences Tripos (engineering). He was also president of the university's Liberal Club, editor of the student Granta magazine, and while conducting postgraduate research in psychology he was elected president of the prestigious Cambridge Union Society. On leaving Cambridge, his parents gave him six weeks to find a job, and he gained employment as the assistant of Michael Balcon.

Career

British films
Stevenson started to write scripts, providing the story of Balaclava (1928). He also worked on the scripts for Greek Street (1930), The Ringer (1931), Night in Montmartre (1931), The Calendar (1931), Michael and Mary (1931) with Edna Best and Herbert Marshall and Sunshine Susie (1931) with Jack Hulbert, Lord Babs (1932), The Faithful Heart (1932) with Best and Marshall, and Love on Wheels (1932) with Hulbert.

Stevenson's debut feature film as director was a Jack Hulbert–Cicely Courtneidge musical, Happy Ever After (1932), a co-production shot in Germany and produced by Eric Pommer. He also wrote the British-German co productions F.P.1 (1933) and Early to Bed (1933).

Stevenson went on to write and direct Falling for You (1933) with Hulbert and Courtneidge, and did some uncredited direction on The Camels Are Coming (1934) with Hulbert. On that film he met Anna Lee, who became his wife in 1935. He was a producer on Little Friend (1934).

Stevenson worked as writer on Thunder in the East (1934) and The Only Girl (1934) with Charles Boyer.

Stevenson received acclaim for Tudor Rose (1936), a film of the Lady Jane Grey story which Stevenson wrote and directed. He directed The Man Who Changed His Mind (1936) with Boris Karloff and Anna Lee, then another with Hulbert, Jack of All Trades (1936).

Stevenson wrote Windbag the Sailor (1936) for Will Hay and Paradise for Two (1937) for Hulbert.

Stevenson directed the action adventure movie King Solomon's Mines (1937) with Lee, Cedric Hardwicke and Paul Robeson. He did a science fiction film with Lee, Non-Stop New York (1937).

Stevenson went to Gainbsorough to do Owd Bob (1938) with Will Fyffe, The Ware Case (1938) with Clive Brook, Young Man's Fancy (1939) with Lee, and Return to Yesterday (1940) with Brook and Lee. He worked on the script for most of the latter films.

Hollywood films
Stevenson received an offer to go to Hollywood to work for David O. Selznick along with Alfred Hitchcock. Selznick only made films intermittently, but he regularly signed talent to long-term contracts and loaned them out to other studios. He loaned Stevenson to RKO he directed Tom Brown's School Days (1940). He went to Universal to direct a new version of Back Street (1941) with Charles Boyer then went back to RKO for Joan of Paris (1942) with Michèle Morgan, a big hit.

Stevenson wrote and directed an adaptation of Jane Eyre (1943) for Selznick starring Orson Welles and Joan Fontaine. He was also one of several directors on Forever and a Day (1943). 

Stevenson directed Hedy Lamarr in Dishonored Lady (1947) and Dick Powell in To the Ends of the Earth (1948).

He returned to RKO, now under the control of Howard Hughes, to make The Woman on Pier 13 (originally, I Married a Communist, 1949). He followed it with Walk Softly, Stranger (1950) with Joseph Cotten, My Forbidden Past (1951) with Robert Mitchum and Ava Gardner, and The Las Vegas Story (1952) with Jane Russell and Victor Mature. He also did some uncredited directing on Macao (1952).

Television
Stevenson went into directing television and directed 6 episodes of the first season of Gunsmoke during which it first went to the top of the TV ratings. He directed over 100 TV episodes in five years including: The Ford Television Theatre, Your Jeweler's Showcase, Footlights Theater, Jane Wyman Presents The Fireside Theatre, Cavalcade of America, Schlitz Playhouse, The Star and the Story, Star Stage, The 20th Century-Fox Hour, The Joseph Cotten Show, Alfred Hitchcock Presents and The Christophers.

Walt Disney
Stevenson worked for the Disney Company in 1956 for six weeks and ending up making 19 films in 20 years. His early credits were Johnny Tremain (1957), a story set in the American Revolution, and Old Yeller (1957), a boy and his dog tale. In 2019, Old Yeller was selected by the Library of Congress for preservation in the National Film Registry for being "culturally, historically, or aesthetically significant".

Stevenson did episodes of Disney's Zorro, then directed a film about Ireland, Darby O'Gill and the Little People (1959), and an adaptation of Kidnapped (1960). He had a commercial success with the comedy The Absent-Minded Professor (1961) and the adventure film In Search of the Castaways (1962). Son of Flubber (1963) was a popular sequel to The Absent-Minded Professor, and The Misadventures of Merlin Jones (1964), a teen comedy, was an unexpected hit, leading to a sequel, The Monkey's Uncle (1965).

None did as well at the box office as Mary Poppins (1964), which gained domestic rentals of $45,000,000 and won five Oscars.

Also among Stevenson's Disney films was the Hayley Mills comedy That Darn Cat! (1965). Stevenson and Disney focused on comedies: The Gnome-Mobile (1967) with Walter Brennan, Blackbeard's Ghost (1968) with Peter Ustinov and Dean Jones, and The Love Bug (1968) with Jones, which was another hit.

Bedknobs and Broomsticks (1971) was an attempt to repeat the success of Mary Poppins. Stevenson directed Herbie Rides Again (1974) with Ken Berry and Helen Hayes, and the adventure story The Island at the Top of the World (1974). One of Our Dinosaurs Is Missing (1975), with Hayes and Ustinov, was a comedy. Stevenson's last feature was The Shaggy D.A. (1976) with Dean Jones.

In July 1977, Variety reported that his track record at Disney made him "the most commercially successful director in the history of films."  At the end of 1976, he had 16 films on Varietys list of all-time domestic rental films, more than any other director at the time, with the second most successful having only 12.  The Shaggy D.A. was to become his 17th, all being Disney films.  The total US and Canadian rentals for these 17 pictures was $188,000,000, which Variety said translated into roughly $250 million in world rentals or an estimated world box office gross of $750 million.

Personal life
Stevenson divorced his first wife Cecilie and married English actress Anna Lee in 1934. They lived on London's Bankside for five years, moving to Hollywood in 1939, where he remained for many years. They had two daughters, Venetia and Caroline, before divorcing in March 1944.

During World War II he became an American citizen and served with Frank Capra in the U.S. Army Signal Corps.

He married Frances Holyoke Howard on 8 October 1944; they later divorced. They had one son, Hugh Howard Stevenson. In 1963 he married Ursula Henderson, and they remained married until Stevenson's death in 1986.  Robert Stevenson's widow, Ursula Henderson, appeared as herself in the documentary Locked in the Tower: The Men behind Jane Eyre in 2007.

Filmography

References

External links

Obituary at New York Times
Obituary at Los Angeles Times

1905 births
1986 deaths
Alumni of St John's College, Cambridge
Disney people
English film directors
Fantasy film directors
Science fiction film directors
Presidents of the Cambridge Union
People from Buxton